The Cat Has Nine Lives is a 1968 West German drama film written and directed by Ula Stöckl. It was screened in the Berlinale Classics section of the 65th Berlin International Film Festival.

Cast
 Liane Hielscher as Katharina
 Kristine De Loup as Anne
 Jürgen Arndt as Stefan
 Elke Kummer as Ehefrau von Stefan
 Alexander Kaempfe as Sascha
 Antje Ellermann
 Hartmut Kirste as Manfred
 Heidi Stroh as Gabriele

References

External links
 

1968 films
1968 drama films
1960s German-language films
West German films
German drama films
1960s German films